The Tuan Muda of Sarawak is the title of the Heir Presumptive to the Rajah of Sarawak.  It literally means "Little Lord". The wife of the Tuan Muda is known the Dayang Muda. Bertram Willes Dayrell Brooke (1876–1965) was titled Tuan Muda of Sarawak.

References

Sarawak